Furnish is a surname. Notable people with the surname include:

 David Furnish (born 1962), Canadian filmmaker
 William M. Furnish (1912–2007), American paleontologist
 Furnish, an aqueous suspension of cellulose fibers from which paper is made